Unconditional Love is the debut and only album by Scottish girl group Lemonescent.

Background
The original working title of the album was "Manipulated" in early 2003 and a portion of the tracks had originally been recorded with original member Lisa Rose Harrison. The original versions appeared as sound clips on Lemonescent's website, but were taken down after Harrison's departure. The tracks were re-recorded with replacement members Leona Skimming and Emma Cassidy's vocals added, with the exception of "Swing My Hips (Sex Dance)", where the Terminalhead remix that appeared on the cd single in 2002 was used. The original Terminalhead remix of "Beautiful" from 2002 was also used on the album.

Release
Lemonescent undertook a signing campaign in HMV and Virgin stores in Scotland and England in the week of the album's release, but despite this campaign, the album sold poorly and failed to chart in the top 200 UK Album Chart. The album also failed to chart in the group's native Scotland, despite the group achieving five top twenty singles in the Scottish Singles Chart. The group later split in 2005.

Track listing
. "Lemonescent Land" 3.15
. "Beautiful [Album Version]" 3.10
. "Unconditional Love" 3.23
. "Cinderella" 4.00
. "Give Me The Beat" 4.39
. "Help Me Mama [Album Version]" 3.07
. "When I Love You" 4.02
. "Feels Like Summertime" 3.34
. "Swing My Hips (Sex Dance)" 5.34
. "Don't Be Afraid" 3.39
. "The Love We Had Before" 3.05
. "You Have Stolen My Heart" 2.56 
. "Ain't Got No Money" 3.57
. "Beautiful (Terminalhead Remix)" 5.37

2003 debut albums